La Vecchia is an Italian surname. Notable people with the surname include:

Jaynee LaVecchia (born 1954), American justice
Luigi Lavecchia (born 1981), Italian footballer

Italian-language surnames